Chief Michael Ade-Ojo, OON (born June 14, 1938) is a Nigerian business magnate and founder of Elizade University in Ilara-Mokin Ondo state, Nigeria.

Early life
Michael Ade-Ojo, known as "The Chief" is a Yoruba from Ondo state southwestern, Nigeria and was born Michael Adeniyan Ojo on June 14, 1938, in Ilara-Mokin, a town in Ondo state into the family of the late Chief Solomon Ojo (c.1878-1956), the Lisa of Ilara-Mokin, and Mrs. Beatrice Ademolawe Ojo (1891-1991), the 5th of six children. His father was polygamous and had 3 wives. His mother, Ademolawe, was the third child of Fatunsin, a daughter of the Ifa priest Erubuola. He attended St. Michael's Anglican School, Ilara-Mokin, Ondo State, Nigeria (1944-1950). He later attended Imade College, Owo, Nigeria (1954-1958), where he obtained the West Africa School Certificate. He proceeded to the University of Nigeria, Nsukka (UNN) in 1961, where he obtained a Bachelor of Arts (B.A.) degree in Business Administration in 1965.

Achievements 
Chief Michael Ade-Ojo is the founder of Elizade University, Ilara Mokin, Ondo State and Elizade Motors.
Today, the company which Ade Ojo started with just one support staff in 1971 has become a conglomerate with several subsidiaries including Toyota Nigeria Limited, Mikeade Investment Co. Ltd, Mikeade Property Dev. Co. Ltd, Classic Motors Ltd, Elizade Autoland Nigeria, Okin Travels Ltd, Oodua Creations Ltd, among others. and just recently, The Chairman, Toyota Nigeria Limited, and founder of Elizade Nigeria Limited, Chief Michael Ade.Ojo, for more than four decades, he has bestrode the Nigerian automotive sector like a colossus, He began to sell various auto brands like Peugeot, Volkswagen, etc., before finally settling for Toyota, a product he turned to a household name in the country. has challenged his son, Demola, who is leading the Elizade Autoland in pushing a new baby of the company, the JAC, to make the Chinese brand another household name among automobile lovers in Nigeria.Ade.Ojo, who said there was still more for Toyota to achieve in Nigeria, also urged the JAC handlers to take a cue from leading auto brands by targeting the number one position.

He said, “We want to continue to be the number one auto company in Nigeria and make the JAC brand to become the number two or even overtake Toyota. I want to see a healthy rivalry between the two automobile brands that are connected to me in Nigeria.”

Ade Ojo is gradually transforming his native town Ilara-Mokin from a village to an economically vibrant town through his various community development projects. President Muhammadu Buhari has congratulated the Chairman of Elizade Motors, Chief Michael Ade-Ojo, as he celebrates his 80th birthday on June 14. Malam Garba Shehu, the President's Senior Special Assistant on Media and Publicity, in a statement in Abuja on Wednesday said the president's congratulatory message was contained in a letter addressed to Chief Ade-Ojo by the president. President Buhari joined the business community, family and friends of Chief Ade-Ojo in felicitating with the “highly resourceful entrepreneur as he celebrates his 80th birthday on June 14, 2018.’’

Fellowship
Fellow, Academy for Entrepreneurial Studies (F.AES) by Ausbeth Ajagu (2007)
Fellow of Lagos State Polytechnic, Ikorodu, Lagos. 2009

Personal life
Chief Ade-Ojo married his first wife, Elizabeth Wuraola Ade-Ojo on February 26, 1966, in Enugu, Nigeria, he had met her at the University of Nsukka. He combined her first name Elizabeth with his middle name, Ade, to create his company name Elizade. He later added his middle name to his last name, Ojo, and it became Ade-Ojo. Among his children include Adeola Ade-Ojo, a fashion designer, Olakunle Ade-Ojo, a businessman, and Ademola Ade-Ojo, a businessman as well. Both of his sons are managing directions in Toyota Nigeria. His wife died and he later remarried to Taiwo Ade-Ojo in 2012.

References

See also
Elizade University

Yoruba businesspeople
1938 births
Living people
Nigerian businesspeople
University of Nigeria alumni
People from Ondo State
Nigerian automobile salespeople
Founders of Nigerian schools and colleges